The 2016 Carpathian Trophy was the 48th edition of the Carpathian Trophy held in Cluj-Napoca, Romania between 26–27 November as a women's friendly handball tournament organised by the Romanian Handball Federation. 

The most recent silver and bronze medalists of the World Championship (Netherlands and Romania) appeared in the competition. Veteran Aurelia Brădeanu announced her retirement from national team after the tournament.

Participants
  Romania (hosts)
  Romania B
  Hungary
  Netherlands

Knockout stage (place 1-4)

Bracket

Semifinals

Third place game

Final

Statistics

Final ranking

Awards
Top Scorer:   
Most Valuable Player: 
Best Goalkeeper:

References

External links
  

 
2016
2016 in handball
2016 in Romanian sport
Sport in Cluj-Napoca
November 2016 sports events in Romania